A number of ships have carried the name Great Western.

 , built for the Great Western Steamship Company. Sold to Royal Mail Steam Packet Company in 1846. Served as a troopship during the Crimean War and scrapped in 1856.
 , built for Ford and Jackson, but used by the Great Western Railway from 1872 to 1890.
 , built for M. Whitwill & Son, Bristol. Wrecked in 1876.
 , built for the Great Western Railway. Renamed G.W.R. 20 in 1933 and scrapped in 1934.
 , built for the Great Western Railway. Scrapped in 1966 by British Rail.

Ship names